Gérardine Mukeshimana is a Rwandan scientist and politician who has served as Minister of Agriculture and Animal Resources since July 2014.

Early life and education
Mukeshimana was born on 10 December 1970 in present-day Huye District. She has an agricultural engineering degree from the National University of Rwanda and a master's degree (2001) and a PhD (2013) in biotechnology from Michigan State University. Her doctoral thesis was entitled "Dissecting the Genetic Complexity of Drought Tolerance Mechanisms in Common Bean (Phaseolus Vulgaris L.)" In 2012, she was awarded the 2012 Board for International Food and Agriculture Development (BIFAD) Student Award for Scientific Excellence for her contributions to Rwanda's bean breeding program.

Career
Mukeshimana was a lecturer in the Faculty of Agriculture at the National University of Rwanda and coordinator for the World Bank's Rural Sector Support Project.

In 2013, Mukeshimana was part of the research team at BecA Hub, a biosciences facility at the International Livestock Research Institute in Nairobi.

Mukeshimana was appointed Minister of Agriculture and Animal Resources in the cabinet of Prime Minister Anastase Murekezi in July 2014. She retained her position in a May 2016 cabinet reshuffle by President Paul Kagame.

In June 2016, Mukeshimana hosted the 7th African Agriculture Science Week and General Assembly of the Forum for Agricultural Research in Africa (FARA) in Kigali, which produced a six-point call to action to achieve the "Africa Feed Africa" initiative. In the cabinet reshuffle of 31 August 2017, Mukeshimana retained her cabinet post and her portfolio.

Publications

References

Living people
Women government ministers of Rwanda
21st-century Rwandan politicians
21st-century Rwandan women politicians
Agriculture ministers of Rwanda
National University of Rwanda alumni
Academic staff of the National University of Rwanda
Michigan State University alumni
People from Huye District
1970 births